Knefastia olivacea, common name the olivaceous turris, is a species of sea snail, a marine gastropod mollusk in the family Pseudomelatomidae, the turrids and allies.

Description
The length of the shell varies between 45 mm and 60 mm.

Distribution
This marine species was found from the Sea of Cortez, Western Mexico, to Ecuador. Fossils have been found in Quaternary strata at the coast of Oaxaca, Mexico; age range: 0.126 to 0.012 Ma; also in Pleistocene strata in Costa Rica

References

 Sowerby, G. B. "The Genera of Recent and Fossil Shells, vol. II." London, pls (1834): 127–262.

External links
 
 Gastropods.com: Knefastia olivacea
 Natural History Museum Rotterdam: Knefastia olivacea
  Bastida-Zavala, Rolando, García-Madrigal, María del, Rosas-Alquicira, Edgar, López-Pérez, Andrés, Benitez Villalobos, Francisco, Meraz, Juan, Torres, Ana, Montoya-Marquez, José, Barrientos-Luján, Norma Arcelia : Marine and coastal biodiversity of Oaxaca, Mexico, 2013; DOI 10.15560/9.2.329
 M. Glibert. - Les Conacea fossiles du Cénozïque étranger; Collections de l'Institut royal des Sciences naturelles de Belgique, 1960

olivacea
Gastropods described in 1834